Sweep It Into Space is the twelfth studio album by alternative rock band Dinosaur Jr., which was released on April 23, 2021 through Jagjaguwar. The first single from the album, "I Ran Away", was released on February 23, 2021, with a music video for the song being released on March 3, 2021. A music video for the album's second single, "Garden", was released on March 31, 2021.

Background
Originally scheduled for release in mid-2020, the record was delayed due to the COVID-19 pandemic. The album was recorded at Amherst's Bisquiteen in late 2019 following the group's West Coast/South East tour. Lou Barlow wrote two of the twelve songs, with the only other musician credited aside from the group being Kurt Vile who played Twelve-string guitar on "I Ran Away".

Reception
Sweep It Into Space earned a great deal of praise with an overall 80/100 score on Metacritic. Charley Ruddell of WBUR-FM called the album "lively and homespun" and said "The album isn’t meant to build on anything the band has already done, but instead revive the spontaneity and DIY of a tight rock band making a rock record." Brad Cohan of the Chicago Reader called it "the best of their version 2.0 output." Ed Condran of The Spokesman-Review singled out Lou Barlow's contributions calling them "two of the album’s finest cuts."

Track listing

Personnel 

Dinosaur Jr.
J Mascis – lead vocals (1–4, 6–11), guitars (1–4, 6–11), production, sound engineer, bass (5, 12)
Lou Barlow – bass (1–4, 6–11), backing vocals, lead vocals (5, 12), guitars (5, 12)
Murph – drums, percussion

Additional personnel
 Kurt Vile – production, guitars (2, 4, 10), backing vocals (1, 2, 4, 6, 8, 10)
 Greg Calbi – mastering
 John Agnello – mixing
 Justin Pizzoferrato – sound engineer
 Marc Seedorf – sound engineer
 Mark Miller – sound engineer
 Joe Nino-Hernes – lacquer cut
 Miles Johnson – layout
 Andy Hope 1930 – artwork

Charts

References

2021 albums
Dinosaur Jr. albums
Jagjaguwar albums
Albums produced by Kurt Vile